AROPS - The Schools’ Alumni Association was previously known as the Association of Representatives of Old Pupils Societies (AROPS).

The AROPS Vision and strategy was updated in 2019 and is detailed on its website https://arops.org.uk/homepage.

AROPS is a United Kingdom organisation whose objective is to provide a forum for the exchange of views and experiences between representatives of old pupils’ societies, as well as professional alumni teams, working in independent and state schools in the U.K. and overseas. 

AROPS aims to help secure the long term future of member schools through the endeavours of their alumni. The association has recently begun to share thought leadership and opinion pieces on relevant national and party policies, and to explore the ways schools’ alumni might support their associated schools’ wider visions and missions.

History
The Association of Representatives of Old Boys' Societies was started by M.E.C. Comer of the Old Johnian Society at an inaugural meeting in December 1971. Its objectives were "to provide a forum for the exchange of views and experience between representatives of old boys’ societies". It was originally envisaged that only members of the Headmasters Conference would join. 

In 1978 the title was altered to its present form to bring girls’ and co-ed schools into the fold. More recently societies from preparatory schools have joined. Today more than 260 schools are represented and membership is open to all schools providing secondary education.

Annual conference
Each May AROPS holds a whole day conference. Venues vary from year to year and are chosen with regard to geographical location and differing type of school—day boarding, co-educational or single-sex. 

Each conference is divided into four sessions which aim to cover a wide range of topics that will be of assistance and interest to society representatives.

Annual general meeting
The AROPS annual general meeting (AGM) is held on a weekday evening in October at a school in the London area and is followed by a buffet supper.

Local networking meetings
A number of local networking meetings are held around the country during the course of the year enabling members to meet informally to discuss matters of concern.

See also
Headmasters' and Headmistresses' Conference

External links
Association of Representatives of Old Pupils Societies

Educational organisations based in the United Kingdom
1971 establishments in the United Kingdom
Organizations established in 1971